Donald Hogarth McDonald (January 11, 1867 – 1928) was a Canadian politician.

Born in 1867 in Qu'Appelle, Saskatchewan, Donald was first elected to the North-West Territories Legislature in an 1896 by-election, he was re-elected for 2 more terms until 1905.

In the 1902 North-West Territories election McDonald became leader of the Northwest Territories Liberal Party, and served as leader of the official opposition during the 5th North-West Legislative Assembly. He came out of retirement during the 1921 Saskatchewan general election and was elected as an Independent member for South Qu'Appelle to the Legislative Assembly of Saskatchewan. He served one term and was defeated by Anton Huck in 1925.

See also
Donald McDonald Hogarth Ontario MPP from the same era.

References

External links
History of the Northwest Territories government 1876 - 1905
Saskatchewan elections by district
Government sustained Calgary Herald May 22, 1902

Northwest Territories Liberal Party MLAs
Independent MLAs in Saskatchewan
People from Qu'Appelle, Saskatchewan
1867 births
1928 deaths